The New Zealand Railway and Locomotive Society Inc is a society of railway enthusiasts, based in Wellington. It was incorporated in 1958.

The society archives are in the Thomas McGavin Building on Ava railway station's former goods yard in the Hutt Valley. At one time an old railway carriage held at the Ngaio railway station was used.

Publications
The society publishes a magazine, the New Zealand Railway Observer, that was first published by the New Zealand Railway Correspondence Society on a Gestetner in 1944, and a newsletter Turntable. The society publishes books on railway subjects. There are currently about 25 books available, as listed on the website. Most are about New Zealand railways, but there is a book Cane Trains about railways in Fiji.

Rolling stock
The society owns steam locomotives AB 608 and X 442.

References

External links
 NZRLS website
 The New Zealand Railway Observer

Rail transport in New Zealand
Organisations based in Wellington
Railway societies